SIGCAT (Special Interest Group on CD Applications and Technology) was a special interest group founded in 1986 by Jerry McFaul, an employee of the US Geological Survey.  It became the world's largest CD-ROM users' group, with over 11,000 members in 75 countries.  SIGCAT held annual conferences until 1999.

In 2002, SIGCAT discovered that it had let its domain name, www.sigcat.org, expire, and that the name had been reregistered by a pornography site operator.  

Around 2002, SIGCAT was absorbed into the DVD Association (DVDA), an organization that had sprung from the CD Interactive Association (CDIA).

External links
 CD-ROM Consistent Interface Guidelines: Final Report, SIGCAT, August 1991
 PC Magazine entry
Carolyn Duffy Marsan, "Porn Sites Hijack Expired Domain Names", PC World, March 8, 2002
 Nancy K. Herther, "The New Information Age for the Federal Government--CP Interviews SIGCAT's Jerry McFaul", CD-ROM Professional, June 1992 (ERIC abstract)
 DVDA official site
A list of SIGCAT programs and activities from the program book of a Russian conference in 1994
Information technology organizations